Alhokm Baad Almozawla (Arabic:الحكم بعد المزاولة) (variously translated as "Judgment After a Prank", "Judgement after Deliberations" and "The Verdict After Judgment") is a popular Egyptian hidden camera/practical joke reality television series. On the show, unsuspecting celebrities are under the pretense that they are being interviewed for an Arabic-speaking German TV network. They are asked about their views on Israel, and then told they are on Israeli TV, provoking a range of reactions.

See also
 List of practical joke topics

References

Arabic-language television shows
Hidden camera television series
Practical jokes